Gail Amundrud-Beattie (born April 6, 1957) is a former competition freestyle swimmer from Canada.

Swimming career
At the 1976 Summer Olympics in Montreal, Quebec, Amundrud won a bronze medal in the women's 4x100-metre freestyle relay, alongside her Canadian teammates Becky Smith, Barbara Clark and Anne Jardin.  Individually, she also finished fifth in the final of the 200-metre freestyle, and advanced to the semifinal of the 100-metre freestyle.

Despite being from Canada she won the 'British Open' 1974 ASA National Championship 100 metres freestyle title and the 200 metres freestyle.

See also
 List of Olympic medalists in swimming (women)
 List of Commonwealth Games medallists in swimming (women)

References

External links
 Canadian Olympic Committee

1957 births
Living people
Arizona State Sun Devils women's swimmers
Canadian female freestyle swimmers
Commonwealth Games bronze medallists for Canada
Commonwealth Games gold medallists for Canada
Commonwealth Games silver medallists for Canada
Olympic bronze medalists for Canada
Olympic bronze medalists in swimming
Olympic swimmers of Canada
Pan American Games bronze medalists for Canada
Pan American Games silver medalists for Canada
Swimmers from Toronto
Swimmers at the 1974 British Commonwealth Games
Swimmers at the 1975 Pan American Games
Swimmers at the 1976 Summer Olympics
Swimmers at the 1978 Commonwealth Games
Swimmers at the 1979 Pan American Games
World Aquatics Championships medalists in swimming
Medalists at the 1976 Summer Olympics
Commonwealth Games medallists in swimming
Pan American Games medalists in swimming
Medalists at the 1975 Pan American Games
Medalists at the 1979 Pan American Games
Medallists at the 1974 British Commonwealth Games
Medallists at the 1978 Commonwealth Games